Utricularia lazulina is a small annual carnivorous plant that belongs to the genus Utricularia. It is endemic to an area around Mangalore, India. U. lazulina grows as a terrestrial plant in shallow wet soils over laterite or in wet grasslands. It was originally described and published by Peter Taylor in 1984.

See also 
 List of Utricularia species

References 

Carnivorous plants of Asia
lazulina
Mangalore
Flora of Karnataka
Plants described in 1984